Taos Day School is a Bureau of Indian Education (BIE)-operated K-8 school, located in Taos Pueblo, New Mexico.

History

In 1996 the school established a pen pal program for indigenous students worldwide, using the internet, in conjunction with the La Plaza Telecommunity Center.

Patricia Kessler started her term as principal circa 2000. Around that time, the school lacked key technology, and Kessler stated that a unified set of curricula had not yet been established. In 2010 the school became the BIE school of the year.

Kessler retired in 2014.

Advanced ED accredited the school in 2015. In 2015 Alfred E. Taylor became the principal.

Operations
In 2010 the school had a designated reading coach and used the Reading First program.

References

External links
 Taos Day School - Out of School Programs

Public elementary schools in New Mexico
Public middle schools in New Mexico
Schools in Taos County, New Mexico
Native American schools
Public K–8 schools in the United States